Saadatabad (also Romanized as Sa‘ādatābād) is a village in Baqerabad Rural District, in the Central District of Mahallat County, Markazi Province, Iran. At the 2006 census, its population was 110, in 30 families.

References 

Populated places in Mahallat County